Urbicius (Urbitius, Urbez, Urbex, Urbiz, Urbice; died c. 805) was a French monk, now a Catholic saint. He was captured by Saracens, escaped, and became a hermit in the Pyrenees, in Aragon. His feast day is 15 December. The Sanctuary of San Úrbez, Huesca, is named after him.

Notes

External links
 Un Santo Bordelés en Aragón
 http://www.catholic.org/saints/saint.php?saint_id=1888
 http://saints.sqpn.com/saint-urbicius/

805 deaths
Medieval French saints
People from Bordeaux
Year of birth unknown